The Millions of Polichinela (Spanish:Los millones de Polichinela) is a 1941 Spanish black-and-white film directed by Gonzalo Delgrás and starring Marta Santaolalla, Luis Peña and Manuel Luna.

The film's art direction was by Pierre Schild.

Cast
   Isabel de Pomés 
 María Luisa Gerona 
 Manuel González 
 Manuel Luna
 Luis Peña 
 Margarita Robles 
 Marta Santaolalla  
 Felisa Torres

References

Bibliography 
 Àngel Comas. Diccionari de llargmetratges: el cinema a Catalunya durant la Segona República, la Guerra Civil i el franquisme, (1930-1975). Cossetània Edicions, 2005.

External links 
 

1941 films
1940s Spanish-language films
Films directed by Gonzalo Delgrás
Spanish black-and-white films
1940s Spanish films